Khaoula Sassi (born 15 March 1998) is a Tunisian canoeist. She competed in the women's K-1 200 metres and the K-2 500 metres  events at the 2020 Summer Olympics.

References

External links
 

1998 births
Living people
People from Sousse
Tunisian female canoeists
Canoeists at the 2020 Summer Olympics
Olympic canoeists of Tunisia
Competitors at the 2019 African Games
African Games silver medalists for Tunisia
African Games medalists in canoeing
21st-century Tunisian women